Marius Bustgaard Larsen (born 14 May 2000) is a Norwegian footballer who plays as a midfielder.

References

External links

2000 births
Living people
Norwegian footballers
Norway youth international footballers
Association football midfielders
Odds BK players
Holstein Kiel players
Pors Grenland players
Eliteserien players
Norwegian Second Division players
Norwegian Third Division players
Norwegian expatriate footballers
Expatriate footballers in Germany
Norwegian expatriate sportspeople in Germany